The 1989–90 edition of the Belgian League was the 87th since its establishment: Which played from September 1989 to May 1990 involved 18 teams, and Club Brugge K.V. won the championship, while K.S.K. Beveren and K.R.C. Mechelen were relegated.

League standings

Results

Topscorers

References

Belgian Pro League seasons
Belgian
1